Patrick Rambaud (born 21 April 1946) is a French writer.

Life
Born in Paris, France, with Michel-Antoine Burnier, he wrote forty pastiches, (satirical novels). They wrote Le Journalisme sans peine (Editions Plon, 1997). In 1970, he help found the iconic magazine Actuel.

Awards
Rambaud received these awards for his book The Battle:
 1997 Prix Goncourt
 1997 Grand Prix du Roman of the Académie française

Works

English translations
The Battle Translators Will Hobson. Grove Press. 2001. .
The Retreat Translators Will Hobson. Grove Press. 2001. .

Bibliography
 Les Complots de la liberté - 1832, Grasset, 1976
 Parodies par Michel-Antoine Burnier & Patrick Rambaud, Balland, 1977, (194 pages with parodies of Simone de Beauvoir, Per Jakez Hélias, Marguerite Duras, Louis Aragon, Henry de Montherlant, Gilles Deleuze et Félix Guattari, André Malraux, Samuel Beckett, Emmanuelle Arsan, Boris Vian, François Mallet-Joris et Philippe Sollers, François Mitterrand, Roland Barthes, André Breton, Françoise Sagan, Maurice Clavel, Gérard de Villiers, Charles de Gaulle.)
 Fric-frac, Grasset, 1984
 La Mort d'un ministre, Grasset, 1985
 Comment se tuer sans avoir l'air, La Table Ronde, 1986
 Virginie Q., Balland, 1988 - sous le pseudonyme de Marguerite Duraille
 Le Visage parle., Balland, 1988
 Elena Ceausescu: carnets secrets, Flammarion, 1990
 Ubu président, Robert Laffont, 1990
 1848, Grasset, 1994
 Les Mirobolantes Aventures de Fregoli, Robert Laffont, 1991
 Le Gros Secret: mémoires du labrador de François Mitterrand, Calmann-Levy, 1996 - sous le pseudonyme Baltique
 Mururoa mon amour, Lattès, 1996 - sous le pseudonyme de Marguerite Duraille
 La Bataille, Grasset, 1997 - (reprint Librairie générale française, 1999)
 Le Journalisme dans peine, Plon, 1997
 Les Aventures de mai, Grasset, 1998
 Il neigeait, Grasset, 2000, (reprint Librairie générale française, 2002)
 Bernard Pivot reçoit…, Grasset, 2001
 Comme des rats, Grasset, 2002
 L'Absent, Grasset, 2003
 Le Sacre de Napoléon - 2 décembre 1804, Michel Lafon, 2004
 L'Idiot du village, Grasset, 2005
 Le Chat botté, Grasset, 2006
 La Grammaire en s'amusant, Grasset, 2007
 Chronique du règne de Nicolas Ier (Chronique des six premiers mois du « règne » de Sarkozy, en pastiche de Saint-Simon ), Paris, Grasset, 2008
 Deuxième chronique du règne de Nicolas Ier, Paris, Grasset, 2009
 Troisième chronique du règne de Nicolas Ier, Paris, Grasset, 2010

See also

References

External links 
 

1946 births
20th-century French journalists
20th-century French writers
21st-century French journalists
21st-century French writers
French historical novelists
Ghostwriters
Grand Prix du roman de l'Académie française winners
Joseph Kessel Prize recipients
Living people
Prix Goncourt winners
Writers from Paris
20th-century French male writers
French male non-fiction writers